Aceste is a genus of echinoderms belonging to the family Schizasteridae.

The genus has almost cosmopolitan distribution.

Species:

Aceste bellidifera 
Aceste ovata 
Aceste weberi

References

Schizasteridae
Echinoidea genera